Higinio Fernández Suárez (born 6 October 1988) is a Spanish former professional racing cyclist. He rode at the 2014 UCI Road World Championships.

Major results

2007
 3rd Road race, National Under-23 Road Championships
2009
 3rd Road race, National Under-23 Road Championships
2010
 3rd Overall Circuito Montañés
 10th Overall Vuelta Ciclista a León
2014
 10th Overall Troféu Joaquim Agostinho

References

External links
 

1988 births
Living people
Spanish male cyclists
People from Valdés, Asturias
Cyclists from Asturias